Rocket Science is the tenth album by the jazz fusion band Tribal Tech released in 2000. It is also the last album of the band before the 2011 comeback.

Track listing
"Saturn 5" – 7:24
"Astro Chimp" – 3:21
"Song Holy Hall" – 4:59
"Rocket Science" – 9:14
"Sojlevska" – 4:04
"Mini Me" – 6:17
"Space Camel" – 5:28
"Moonshine" – 5:18
"Cap'n Kirk" – 3:01
"The Econoline" – 10:00

Personnel
Scott Henderson - guitar
Gary Willis - bass
Scott Kinsey - keyboards
Kirk Covington - drums

References

2000 albums
Tribal Tech albums